Basil Duck Reed (8 November 1895 – 12 October 1968) was an English first-class cricketer and Royal Navy officer.

Reed was born in November 1895 at Malmesbury, Wiltshire. He began serving in the Royal Navy in July 1913 as a clerk, before becoming a paymaster. He was serving as a sub lieutenant assistant-paymaster in December 1917. He made a single appearance in first-class cricket for the Royal Navy against the British Army cricket team at Lord's in 1921. Batting twice in the match, Reed ended the Royal Navy first-innings not out on 8, while in their second-innings he was dismissed without scoring by Tom Jameson. He took a single wicket in the match, dismissing Francis Brooke in the Army's first-innings, finishing with match figures of 1 for 83. He made his debut in minor counties cricket for Wiltshire against Dorset in the 1921 Minor Counties Championship, and made three further appearances in 1923. He was promoted from the rank of lieutenant commander to paymaster commander in January 1935, retaining that rank until at least August 1939. He died in October 1968 at Wroughton, Wiltshire.

References

External links

1895 births
1968 deaths
Sportspeople from Malmesbury
Royal Navy officers
Royal Navy personnel of World War I
English cricketers
Royal Navy cricketers
Wiltshire cricketers
Royal Navy logistics officers